The Moses River  is a smaller river in Mpumalanga and Limpopo Provinces, South Africa. It flows northwards and is a tributary of the Olifants River, joining its left bank near Marblehall.

See also
 List of rivers of South Africa

References 

Olifants River (Limpopo)
Rivers of Limpopo